Health Care Service Corporation (HCSC) is a member-owned health insurance company in the United States. HCSC was formerly known as Hospital Service Corporation and changed its name to Health Care Service Corporation in 1975. The company was founded in 1936 and is based in Chicago, Illinois with a network of offices in the United States. Health Care Service Corporation is the licensee of the Blue Cross and Blue Shield Association for five states. It concentrates its operations in Illinois, Montana, New Mexico, Oklahoma, and Texas.

HCSC is the fifth-largest health insurer in the US overall and employs more than 23,000 people. As of 2019, it was noted to be the third-largest commercial health insurer in the United States  It serves nearly 16 million members. HCSC offers group life, disability, and dental policies, as well as a range of other individual policies. The company also provides various care management and wellness resources.

Geographical area of operations
 HCSC's operations are concentrated in Illinois and Texas, which accounted for 84% of total revenue through the first nine months of 2014, followed by Oklahoma (9% of revenue).

HCSC's membership was approximately 16 million as of December 31, 2019. HCSC's revenue continues to be concentrated in Illinois and Texas, accounting for 83% of premium for the full year 2017. The company's next largest state in terms of premiums is Oklahoma, accounting for approximately 9% of premium.

In January 2020, HCSC announced that it was cutting about 400 employees, most of them in middle management, in order to reduce organizational redundancy and improve decision making efficiency.

Educational opportunities 
As of May 1, 2019, HCSC announced an in-house educational program aimed at developing the skills of its employees, dubbed Blue University. Blue University will focus on a number of topics such as healthcare management, leadership, marketing and sales, technology, and service delivery to name a few. Alongside Blue University, HCSC has partnered with local universities where it operates to offer master's degree and certificate partnerships for employees.

Financial information
, HCSC was the country's largest nonpublic health insurer and the fifth-largest health insurer overall, with more than 16 million members.  HCSC's membership was approximately 16 million at December 31, 2019. HCSC's revenue continues to be concentrated in Illinois and Texas, accounting for 83% of premium for the full year 2017.

In 2010 HCSC nearly doubled its income to $1.09 billion, and began "a streak of billion-dollar profits for 4 straight years".
Between 2009 and 2013, HCSC's five-year average of return on capital was 10.5%.  During 2014 HCSC profits decreased "from medical losses and expenses associated with the company's aggressive addition of members sourced from ACA exchanges". Yet in 2015, Fitch Ratings assessed its financial strength still at 'A+' and gave it an 'A' for likelihood of default and senior unsecured rating. 
Finch stated that "lack of geographic diversification has historically kept HCSC out of the 'AA' rating category and that HCSC would be downgraded if it were no longer to market itself as a Blues plan.

HCSC reported a strong underwriting profit in 2017 after losses related to Affordable Care Act (ACA) exchange-sourced business in 2014 and 2015. The company reported annualized return on capital of greater than 40% through the first half of 2018, where achieving a high single-digit ROC would be consistent with Fitch's median guideline for the current rating category. An income tax benefit related to the enactment of the Tax Cuts and Jobs Act equal to $833 million contributed to the sizeable ROC ratio during the first half of 2018. Results are expected to moderate somewhat during the second half of 2018 as policyholders exhaust their deductibles and HCSC pays a greater percentage of claims.

References

Financial services companies established in 1936
Companies based in Chicago
Insurance companies based in Illinois
Mutual insurance companies
Members of Blue Cross Blue Shield Association
Mutual insurance companies of the United States
Health care companies based in Illinois